Bowdeniella is a species of bacteria from the family of Actinomycetaceae which was isolated from a human nose.

References

Actinomycetales
Monotypic bacteria genera
Bacteria described in 2003